Bapawar Kalan is a small town in Southeast part of Indian state of Rajasthan. It is located around 37 kilometers south of the Kota district headquarter. It has a railway station, a hospital, schools, markets, and roads for traffic. The people of Bapawar Kalan primarily engage in agricultural activities.

Literacy 

There is a gender gap in literacy rates in Bapawar Kalan, with male literacy standing at 87.21% compared to female literacy at 61.10%.

Population 
According to the 2011 Population Census, the village has a total population of 7,170, with 3,729 male residents and 3,441 female residents. There are a total of 1,416 families residing in the village.

References 

Cities and towns in Kota district